Dunn County is a county in the U.S. state of Wisconsin. As of the 2020 census, the population was 45,440. Its county seat is Menomonie. Dunn County comprises the Menomonie Micropolitan Statistical Area and is included in the Eau Claire-Menomonie, WI Combined Statistical Area.

History
Dunn county was founded in 1854 from Chippewa County and organized in 1857. It is named for Charles Dunn, the territory's first chief justice.

Geography

Adjacent counties
 Barron County - north
 Chippewa County - east
 Eau Claire County - southeast
 Pepin County - south
 Pierce County - southwest
 Polk County - northwest
 Saint Croix County - west

Major highways

Railroads
Canadian National
Union Pacific

Buses
Dunn County Transit
List of intercity bus stops in Wisconsin

Airports
 Menomonie Municipal Airport (KLUM) serves the county and surrounding communities.
 Boyceville Municipal Airport (3T3) enhances county service.

Demographics

2020 census
As of the census of 2020, the population was 45,440. The racial makeup of the county was 90.7% White, 3.2% Asian, 0.9% Black or African American, 0.5% Native American, 1.0% from other races, and 3.8% from two or more races. Ethnically, the population was 2.3% Hispanic or Latino of any race.

2000 census

As of the census of 2000, there were 39,858 people, 14,337 households, and 9,261 families residing in the county.  The population density was 47 people per square mile (18/km2).  There were 15,277 housing units at an average density of 18 per square mile (7/km2).  The racial makeup of the county was 96.08% White, 0.34% Black or African American, 0.27% Native American, 2.13% Asian, 0.01% Pacific Islander, 0.37% from other races, and 0.80% from two or more races.  0.84% of the population were Hispanic or Latino of any race. 39.3% were of German, 22.6% Norwegian and 5.1% Irish ancestry. 95.7% spoke English, 1.6% Spanish and 1.5% Hmong as their first language.

There were 14,337 households, out of which 31.40% had children under the age of 18 living with them, 54.10% were married couples living together, 6.90% had a female householder with no husband present, and 35.40% were non-families. 24.40% of all households were made up of individuals, and 9.00% had someone living alone who was 65 years of age or older.  The average household size was 2.57 and the average family size was 3.07.

In the county, the population was spread out, with 23.30% under the age of 18, 19.80% from 18 to 24, 25.70% from 25 to 44, 19.80% from 45 to 64, and 11.20% who were 65 years of age or older.  The median age was 31 years. For every 100 females there were 101.70 males.  For every 100 females age 18 and over, there were 102.20 males.

In 2017, there were 443 births, giving a general fertility rate of 47.7 births per 1000 women aged 15–44, the fourth lowest rate out of all 72 Wisconsin counties.

Communities

City
 Menomonie

Villages
 Boyceville
 Colfax
 Downing
 Elk Mound
 Knapp
 Ridgeland
 Wheeler

Towns

 Colfax
 Dunn
 Eau Galle
 Elk Mound
 Grant
 Hay River
 Lucas
 Menomonie
 New Haven
 Otter Creek
 Peru
 Red Cedar
 Rock Creek
 Sand Creek
 Sheridan
 Sherman
 Spring Brook
 Stanton
 Tainter
 Tiffany
 Weston
 Wilson

Census-designated places
 Downsville
 Tainter Lake

Unincorporated communities

 Baxter
 Caryville
 Cedar Falls
 Comfort
 Connorsville
 Dunnville
 Eau Galle
 Falls City
 Graytown (partial)
 Hatchville (partial)
 Irvington
 Meridean
 Norton
 Red Cedar
 Rock Falls
 Rusk
 Sand Creek
 Weston

Ghost towns/neighborhoods
 Old Tyrone
 Welch Point

Politics

See also
 National Register of Historic Places listings in Dunn County, Wisconsin

References

External links
 Dunn County, Wisconsin website
 Dunn County Historical Society
 Dunn County map from the Wisconsin Department of Transportation

 
1857 establishments in Wisconsin
Populated places established in 1857